Jonathan S Hooper (born 1962) is a British painter and sculptor.

Jonathan Hooper was brought up in Cornwall, southwest England, in the 1960s. His father, Harry Hooper, was also a painter. He studied structural engineering at university, followed by a master's degree from Imperial College London.

Hooper worked in Japan for three years. After returning from Japan, Hooper worked on painting and sculpture, influenced by his interest in Japanese calligraphy and printing techniques. Hooper has held exhibitions at The Nine British Art and elsewhere. He has also produced books.

Books

References

External links
 Jonathan S Hooper website
 Jonathan S Hooper on Instagram
 Jonathan S Hooper on LinkedIn

1962 births
Living people
People from Cornwall
Alumni of Imperial College London
20th-century British painters
21st-century British painters
20th-century British sculptors
21st-century British sculptors
21st-century male artists
English male painters
Abstract painters
English landscape painters
English male sculptors